Karl Hürthle (March 16, 1860 – March 23, 1945) was a German physiologist and histologist who was a native of Ludwigsburg.

In 1884 he received his doctorate from the University of Tübingen, where he remained until 1886, working as a prosector at the anatomical institute. At Tübingen, he was a student and assistant to physiologists Karl von Vierordt (1818-1884) and Paul Grützner (1847-1919). In 1887 he became an assistant to Rudolf Heidenhain (1834-1897) at the physiological institute in Breslau, and in 1895 attained the title of professor extraordinarius. In 1898, he succeeded Heidenhain at the department of physiology in Breslau.

Later in his career, he worked at the physiological institute at Tübingen, and also in the department of experimental pathology and therapy at the Kerckhoff Institute in Bad Nauheim (now known as the Max Planck Institute for Heart and Lung Research).

Hürthle is remembered for contributions made in the field of haemodynamics. He performed extensive research involving blood pressure, blood viscosity, intracranial circulation, blood supply of organs, vasodilatation, and a phenomenon he called Windkesseleffekt, of which he demonstrated plays an important role in the maintenance of blood pressure.

He also described the motion phenomena of the arterial vascular wall, performed studies involving the structure of striated muscle, and investigated the function and morphology of the thyroid gland. A large, granular epithelial cell sometimes found in the thyroid is called a "Hürthle cell".

Selected publications 
 Zur Technik der Untersuchung des Blutdruckes (Studies involving blood pressure), 1888
 Untersuchungen über die Innervation der Hirngefäße (Studies on the innervation of brain vessels), 1889 
 Ueber eine Methode zur Registrierung des arteriellen Blutdrucks beim Menschen (A method for registration of arterial blood pressure in humans), 1896 
 Über die Struktur der querstreiftem Muskelfasern von Hydrophilus 1909
 Histologische Struktur und optische Eigenschaften der Muskeln (Histological structure and optical properties of muscles), 1925 
 Blutkreislauf im Gehirn (Blood circulation in the brain), 1927 
 Die mittlere Blutversorgung der einzelnen Organe (The average blood supply to the individual organs), 1927
 Über tonische und pulsatorische Bewegungen der Arterienwand (About tonic and pulsatory movements of the arterial wall), 1939

References 

 This article was based on a translation of an equivalent article at the German Wikipedia

External links
 

German physiologists
German histologists
1945 deaths
1860 births
Academic staff of the University of Breslau
University of Tübingen alumni